Ida Nilsson (born February 8, 1981) is a Swedish long-distance runner who also competes in ski mountaineering. In 2003 – 2006 she won a total of ten gold medals in Swedish championships in track & field and cross country running, plus two NCAA gold medals. After many years away from training Nilsson won the Swedish championship in ski mountaineering in 2016 and a couple of months later won the prestigious Transvulcania ultramarathon.

Childhood and youth
Nilsson hails from Kalmar in the flat southern Sweden. She grew up in a sports family where both her father Carl-Gustaf ”Calle” and mother Katarina competed at an elite level. Two brothers, Marcus and David, and a sister, Johanna, have belonged to the Swedish national team in athletics. At the 2002 Swedish cross country championships the family walked home with four gold medals, one silver and one bronze.

In 2001–2005 Nilsson studied at the Northern Arizona University in Flagstaff, USA. She and her sister, Johanna Nilsson, ran for the Northern Arizona Lumberjacks collegiate team and had much success. Nilsson won the 2004 NCAA collegiate outdoor championships in 3000 m steeplechase and 2005 indoor championships in 5000 m. The two sisters were both ranked in the top three of a 2014 poll of greatest women's athletes in the Big Sky Conference. Nilsson won four cross country titles in that regional conference. Both were inducted into the Northern Arizona Lumberjacks hall of fame.

Track & field and cross country

Top years
During the first years of the 21st century Nilsson was the Swedish dominant in 5000 metres and 3000 m steeplechase, then a relatively new sport for women. In 2003, she was awarded the prestigious Stora grabbars och tjejers märke for her sports achievements. She finished seventh in the 3000m steeplechase at the 2006 European Athletics Championships in Gothenburg, where she set the Swedish national record at 9:39.24, a personal best. She also participated in the 2005 World Championships in Athletics in Helsinki. In the summer of 2006 Nilsson ran 3000 m in 9:01.01, the fastest time by a Swedish athlete in more than 10 years. Nilsson's personal best for 5000 m is 15:33.18.

Injuries
After leaving college in Arizona Nilsson had a series of injuries, including a stress fracture in her hip joint in 2009. The injury didn’t fully heal until the summer of 2013, and Nilsson gave up her track & field career. After this she basically didn't run at all for five years.

Personal bests
The following list is based on information from Nilsson's club Högby IF.

Nilsson has never run an official 10 000 m on a track; her best similar performance is 35:03 in a 2016 road race.

Mountain running and ski mountaineering

After many years of serious injuries Nilsson was finally able to run again in 2013. Nilsson: "Now even my body feels better than 10-15 years ago. Now I feel like young again."
In 2015 Nilsson won the Swedish mountain marathon Fjällmaraton. Later the same year, in her ultramarathon debut, she placed second in the 90 kilometer Ultravasan in Sweden. In early 2016 she became ski mountaineering Swedish champion at Keb Classic (with Jenny Råghall) and won the Transvulcania mountain ultramarathon in the Canary Islands.

In 2016 and again in 2017 she became Swedish road running champion in the masters athletics class for women 35 years. In the summer of 2016 Nilsson won the Marathon du Mont Blanc in Chamonix, France, proving that the unexpected Transvulcania win was not a fluke and planting Nilsson firmly in the world elite.

During the winter 2015 – 2016 Nilsson lived in Chamonix, France, and trained ski mountaineering with Emelie Forsberg. According to Nilsson it was Forsberg who inspired her to test more ultratrail. In running events Nilsson competes for Högby IF in Sweden, Måndalen IL in Norway and Salomon Running internationally. In ski mountaineering her club affiliation is Fjällframfart in Swedish events.

Nilsson has trained as a cook, a wilderness and adventure guide and as masseur.
For a living she has run a small company registered in 2015 as a sole proprietorship called Running soul – Ida Nilsson, that according to the Facebook site with the same name offered "massage, sports massage, yoga classes, workshops and training camps for runners".
As of 2018 Nilsson lives in Måndalen in the Rauma municipality in the Norwegian county Møre og Romsdal, and makes a living from skyrunning and ski mountaineering.
In 2018 Nilsson together with fellow athletes Emelie Forsberg and Mimmi Kotka started Moonvalley, an on-line shop dedicated to organic energy bars and sportsdrinks.

Results

Cross country and sky running

The following list includes only results after Nilsson's comeback after her five year injury period. A fair number of the races, in particular in her native country Sweden, are asphalt races or otherwise not strictly cross country or mountain running.

2014
 1st, Spring en mil vinn en bil , Sweden

2015
 2nd, Kungsholmen Runt , Sweden
 2nd, Spring en mil vinn en bil , Sweden
 1st, Böda Beach run , Sweden
 2nd, Sweden
 1st, Hornindal runt , Norway
 3rd, Vetenløpet VK, Norway
 1st, Victorialoppet , Sweden
 1st, Hornsjön Runt , Sweden
 6th, Peak Performance Vertical K, Sweden
 1st, Fjällmaraton , Sweden
 1st, Salomon Trail Tour Järvsö , Sweden
 2nd, Ultravasan , Sweden
 2nd, Lidingöloppet , Sweden
 1st, Salomon Trail Tour Sälen, Sweden , Sweden

2016
 1st, Nordic Classic Running , Sweden
 1st, Salomon City Trail , Sweden
 1st, Transvulcania , Spain
 15th, Göteborgsvarvet , Sweden (personal best for the half marathon distance)
 1st, Mönsterås Stadslopp , Sweden
 3rd, Sthlm 10 , Sweden (also Swedish championship in road running, won the masters athletics class for women 35 years, personal best for the 10 km road running distance)
 1st, Öland Ultra , Sweden
 6th, Marathon du Mont Blanc Vertical km, France
 1st, Marathon du Mont Blanc , France
 1st, Böda Beach run , Sweden (2nd straight victory)
 10th, Dolomites Sky Race, 22 km, Italy
 4th, Buff Epic Trail , Spain (also World Championship in the Sky discipline)
 1st, Salomon 27K , Sweden (course record)
 3rd, Peak Performance Vertical K, Sweden
 1st, Fjällmaraton , Sweden (2nd straight victory, course record)
 1st, The Rut 50K, Montana, USA
 1st, Nordic Extreme running, Sweden
 2nd, Trail de l'Arclusaz , France
 1st, The North Face Endurance Challenge , San Francisco, USA
 1st, Sylvesterloppet, Sweden (new course record)

2017
 1st, Ultimate Tsaigu Trail , China 
 1st, Yading VK, China 
 1st, Yading Kora Ultra , China 
 1st, Transvulcania , Spain (2nd straight victory, new course record) 
 1st, Åndalsnesløpet , Norway
 3rd, Sthlm 10 , Sweden (also Swedish championship in road running, won the masters athletics class for women 35 years for a 2nd straight victory)
 1st, Öland Ultra , Sweden (2nd straight victory, course record)
 2nd Marathon du Mont Blanc , Italy
 1st, Böda Beach run , Sweden (3rd straight victory)
 3rd, Sweden
 2nd, Mefjellet Opp, Vertical km, Norway
 1st, Swiss Alpine Marathon , Switzerland
 1st, Fjällmaraton , Sweden (3rd straight victory)
 1st, Ultravasan , Sweden (new course record)
 3rd, Lidingöloppet , Sweden
 2nd, Grand Trail des Templiers , France
 1st, North Face Endurance Challenge , California, USA (2nd straight victory)

2018
 1st, Transvulcania , Spain (3rd straight victory)
 1st, Maratòn Alpina Zegama-Aizkorri , Spain
 1st, Birkebeinerløpet , Norway
 3rd, Sthlm 10 , Sweden (also Swedish championship in road running, second in the masters athletics class for women 35 years)
 1st, Öland Ultra , Sweden (3rd straight victory, also 1st overall)
 2nd, Besseggløpet , Norway
 2nd, Marathon du Mont Blanc , France
 1st, Mefjellet Opp, Vertical km, Norway
 1st, Swiss Alpine Marathon , Switzerland
 8th, Sierre-Zinal , Switzerland
 2nd, Ultravasan , Sweden
 3rd Ultra-Trail Courmayeur-Champex-Chamonix (CCC) , France
 6th, Lidingöloppet , Sweden
 9th, Otter African Trail Run , South Africa
 5th, Swedish Cross Country Championships , Sweden
 11th, Swedish Cross Country Championships , Sweden

2019
 1st The Coastal Challenge , 6 stages, Costa Rica (new course record; 2nd overall)
 1st Monument Valley Half Marathon , USA
 1st Crown King Scramble , USA (new course record)
 1st Skälbyloppet , Sweden

2021
 1st Victorialoppet , Sweden (second victory)
 1st Böda Sandsloppet , Sweden
 1st Salomon 27K , Sweden (second victory)
 1st Fjällmaraton , Sweden (fourth victory)
 2nd Idre Fjällmaraton , Sweden
 3rd, Romsdalseggenløpet , Norway
 1st, Marató Pirineu , Spain

2022
 1st Fjällmaraton , Sweden (fifth victory)
 4th, Ultra Pirineu , Spain
 2nd, Trail World Championships , Thailand

2023
 5th, Black Canyon , USA

World Cup wins

Ski mountaineering

Fastest Known Time (FKT)
She has held the fastest known time on the following routes:

 Grand Canyon, Arizona, USA, Women's FKT Rim-to Rim-to Rim (R2R2R), 7h29m16s, November 16, 2018. Taylor Newlin bettered Nilsson's time just a few days later.

References

Notes

External links
Ida Nilsson
 
 Ida Nilsson's Swedish blog on Runner's World
 Ida Nilsson's profile at DUV
 Ida Nilsson's profile at ITRA
Skyrunning
 International Skyrunning Federation website
 Skyrunner World Series website
 Vertical Kilometer World Circuit website
Ski mountaineering
 International Ski Mountaineering website

1981 births
Living people
Swedish female long-distance runners
Northern Arizona Lumberjacks women's track and field athletes
Swedish mountain runners
Swedish ultramarathon runners
Swedish female ski mountaineers
Female ultramarathon runners
Swedish female steeplechase runners
Swedish sky runners
Northern Arizona Lumberjacks women's cross country runners
People from Rauma, Norway